The Roland JD-XA is a hybrid analog and digital synthesizer that was released in 2015 alongside the JD-Xi, it is Roland's first analog polyphonic synthesizer since 1986.  The instrument is encased by a shiny black front panel covered with knobs and sliders reminiscent of the Roland JD-800.  The JD-XA comprises a 4 voice analog engine and a 64 voice digital engine, which can be used interactively or independently, thus providing a flexible platform for sound design.

Notable users 
 Gary Numan
 Nick Rhodes
 Scott Tibbs
 Shimron Elit
 Ulrich Schnauss (Tangerine Dream)

References 

Roland synthesizers
Analog synthesizers
Digital synthesizers
Polyphonic synthesizers